Thomas Derrick Sanders (born January 4, 1962) is a former professional American football running back in the National Football League (NFL) for six seasons for the Chicago Bears and Philadelphia Eagles. He was a member of the Bears team that won Super Bowl XX following the 1985 NFL season. He was also a member of the "Shuffling Crew" in the video The Super Bowl Shuffle. He played college football at Texas A&M University.

References

1962 births
Living people
American football running backs
Chicago Bears players
Philadelphia Eagles players
Texas A&M Aggies football players
People from Giddings, Texas